Let George Do It is an American radio drama series produced from 1946 to 1954 by Owen and Pauline Vinson. Bob Bailey starred as private investigator George Valentine; Olan Soule voiced the role in 1954. Don Clark directed the scripts by David Victor and Jackson Gillis.

History and description
The few earliest episodes were more sitcom than private eye shows, with a studio audience providing scattered laughter. The program then changed into a suspenseful tough guy private eye series.

Sponsored by Standard Oil of California, now known as Chevron, the program was broadcast on the West Coast Don Lee network of the Mutual Broadcasting System from October 18, 1946, to September 27, 1954, first on Friday evenings and then on Mondays. In its last season, transcriptions were aired in New York Wednesdays at 9:30 p.m. from January 20, 1954 to January 12, 1955.

Clients came to Valentine's office after reading a newspaper that carried his classified ad:

Personal notice: Danger's my stock in trade. If the job's too tough for you to handle, you've got a job for me. George Valentine.  Write full details!

The newspaper ad varied from show to show, but always opened with "Danger is my stock in trade" and closed with "Write full details!"

Characters and actors
George Valentine was a professional detective. Valentine's secretary was Claire Brooks, a.k.a. Brooksie (voiced by Frances Robinson, then by Virginia Gregg, and then by Lillian Buyeff). As Valentine made his rounds in search of perpetrators, he occasionally encountered Brooksie's kid brother, Sonny (Eddie Firestone) or elevator man Caleb (Joseph Kearns). Police Lieutenant Riley (Wally Maher) was a more regular guest. For the first few shows, Sonny was George's assistant, given to exclamations such as "Jeepers!" but he was soon relegated to an occasional character.

John Hiestand was the program's announcer.

Other personnel
The background music was supplied by Eddie Dunstedter, initially with a full orchestra. When television supplanted radio as the country's primary home entertainment, radio budgets got skimpier and skimpier and Dunstedter's orchestra was replaced by an organ (played by Dunstedter), as from January 1949.

References

External links
 Let George Do It 242 Episodes of Let George Do It available at the Internet archive.

1946 radio programme debuts
1954 radio programme endings
1940s American radio programs
1950s American radio programs
American radio dramas
Mutual Broadcasting System programs
Detective radio shows
Don Lee Network programs